P. fragilis may refer to:
 Pentachaeta gracilis, a plant species in the genus Pentachaeta endemic to California
 Polysiphonia fragilis, a red alga species
 Phreatogammarus fragilis, an amphipod species found only in New Zealand's South Island

Synonyms
 Pleurothallis fragilis, a synonym for Acianthera luteola, an orchid species

See also
 Fragilis (disambiguation)